Horace Lyman (November 16, 1815 – March 31, 1887) was a reverend and professor of mathematics in the U.S. state of Oregon.

He was born in Massachusetts, and came to Oregon by way of New York and Cape Horn in October 1848. He married Mary Dennison the next month. He established a school in Portland in 1849, and helped establish the Hillsboro School District in Hillsboro in 1851. He was a founder of Portland's First Congregational Church in June 1851. He was founding secretary of LaCreole Academic Institutue near Dallas, Oregon in 1856.

Lyman served as Hillsboro's first commissioner, and later its school superintendent. He later taught math at Pacific University in Forest Grove, where he died in 1887.

His son, Horace Sumner Lyman, was a prominent journalist, historian, and educator.

References

External links 
 Transactions of the Fourteenth Annual Reunion of the Oregon Pioneer Association (1886)

 letter to the Oregonian, 1852

 

Oregon clergy
1815 births
1887 deaths
Educators from Oregon
People from Hillsboro, Oregon
Pacific University faculty
People from Forest Grove, Oregon
People from Easthampton, Massachusetts
Williams College alumni
19th-century American clergy